Laurenceomyia is a genus of moth flies in the subfamily Bruchomyiinae.  Species have been recorded principally from south America, with many, including the type, transferred from the genus Nemopalpus.

Description
The genus Laurenceomyia was dedicated to Lawrence W. Quate for his studies on Psychodidae.  "According to cladistics analysis, the diagnostic characters of this genus are: aedeagus about as long as ejaculatory apodeme and gonocoxites with [a mid] projection near apex; gonostyli elongate, straight along most of their length, subapically strongly bent with blunt apex."

Species
Laurenceomyia capixaba (Santos, 2009)
Laurenceomyia dampfianus (Alexander, 1940)
Laurenceomyia pallipes (Shannon & Del Ponte, 1927)
Laurenceomyia peixotoi Santos, Brazil & Pinto, 2021
Laurenceomyia pilipes (Tonnoir, 1922)
Laurenceomyia similis (Wagner & Stuckenberg, 2012)

References

Nematocera genera
Diptera of South America
Psychodidae
Taxa named by Brian Roy Stuckenberg